Per-Axel Daniel Rank Arosenius (7 November 1920 – 21 March 1981) was a Swedish film and television actor of mostly supporting parts. His most prominent film role was that of Soviet defector Boris Kusenov in the thriller film Topaz (1969), directed by Alfred Hitchcock.

Death
After a dispute with the Swedish taxation authorities, Arosenius protested by setting himself on fire outside their office in Nacka. He died, age 60, in the ambulance on the way to the hospital.

Selected filmography

 Lasse-Maja (1941) – Man at the inn (uncredited)
Lågor i dunklet (1942) – Student (uncredited)
 Man's Woman (1945) – Man in village
13 solar (1945) – Waiter at Café Royal
 Incorrigible (1946) – Teacher (uncredited)
Krigsmans erinran (1947) – Soldier (uncredited)
Kvarterets olycksfågel (1947) – Constable (uncredited)
 The Poetry of Ådalen (1947) – Lindskog
 Foreign Harbour (1948) – Watier (uncredited)
Flottans kavaljerer (1948) – Kurre Karlsson's Buddy (uncredited)
Sjösalavår (1949) – Man at Elvira's Party (scenes deleted)
 Big Lasse of Delsbo (1949) – Ekstedt
Miss Julie (1951) – The count's friend (uncredited)
Drömsemester (1952) – Policeman (uncredited)
Kalle Karlsson of Jularbo (1952) – Olles kamrat (uncredited)
For the Sake of My Intemperate Youth (1952) – Priest (scenes deleted)
 The Shadow (1953) – Journalist (uncredited)
Kungen av Dalarna (1953) – Government member at cabinet meeting (uncredited)
 The Road to Klockrike (1953) – Dollys vän på Amerikabåten (uncredited)
 Café Lunchrasten (1954) – Police officer (uncredited)
 Darling of Mine (1955) – Policeman at Dalarö (uncredited)
 Whoops! (1955) – Police Officer (uncredited)
 Night Child (1956) – Plain-clothes policeman (uncredited)
Kulla-Gulla (1956) – Man at the fire (uncredited)
 The Girl in Tails (1956) – Farm hand (uncredited)
Johan på Snippen (1956) – Vicar
 The Lady in Black (1958)) – Johansson, Policeman (uncredited)
Bara en kypare (1959) – Train Conductor (uncredited)
A Matter of Morals (1961) – Taxi Driver
Sällskapslek (1963) – Vicar (uncredited)
En vacker dag (1963) – Tv-tittare (uncredited)
Tre dar i buren (1963) – Aide-de-camp (uncredited)
Komedi i Hägerskog (1968) – Ernfridsson
Ni ljuger (1969) – Police officer (uncredited)
Topaz (1969) – Boris Kusenov
Grisjakten (1970) – Official
Skräcken har 1000 ögon (1970) – X-ray Doctor
Midsommardansen (1971)
Maid in Sweden (1971) – Father 
Lockfågeln (1971) – Dr. Westman (uncredited)
 (1972) – Dr. Gunnar Hemlin
Firmafesten (1972) – 'Luddes' daddy
 Andersson's Kalle (1972) – Captain
Smutsiga fingrar (1973) – Kobalski, drug dealer (uncredited)
Thriller - A Cruel Picture (1973) – Frigga's Father
 Andersson's Kalle on Top Form (1973) – Teacher
Sängkamrater (1974) – Marianne's and Beryl's father
What the Swedish Butler Saw (1975) – Rev. Faversham
Faneflukt (1975) – Konsulent i UD
Eddie og Suzanne (1975) – Swedish policeman
Breaking Point (1975) – Guns and Ammo Dealer (uncredited)
Release the Prisoners to Spring (1975) – Police officer
I lust och nöd (1976) – Karl Fredrik Andersson
Victor Frankenstein (1975) – The Inspector
Bröderna Lejonhjärta (1977) – Tengil's Man 
Bröderna Lejonhjärta (1977)
Mannen som blev miljonär (1980) – SÄPO-man

References

External links
 

1920 births
1981 suicides
20th-century Swedish male actors
Swedish male film actors
Swedish male television actors
Suicides by self-immolation
Suicides in Sweden